INSA may refer to:

INSA (Germany), a German poll institute
Indian National Science Academy, a national science academy based in Delhi
Information Network Security Agency, the Ethiopian intelligence agency that is run by the Ministry of Peace
Institut national des sciences appliquées, National Institute of Applied Sciences in France
Instituto Nacional de Saúde Dr. Ricardo Jorge, the National Health Institute of Portugal
Intelligence and National Security Alliance, an alliance of intelligence business interests
Israeli Nano Satellite Association